The OneTax is a tax reform plan and proposed amendment to the United States Constitution that eliminates the federal income tax for all individuals earning less than $215,870. The OneTax is described as revenue-neutral, which means that it compensates for lost revenue from the income tax by closing loopholes and eliminating tax expenditures in the current income tax system.

Background
The current United States income tax system imposes higher costs of tax compliance than any other country, with direct costs exceeding $460 billion, and indirect deadweight loss costs of over $1.2 trillion. As this figure was calculated in 2004, it is likely that the actual current deadweight loss caused by the income tax is more than $1.4 trillion. As a national sales would create comparable deadweight loss, tax reform plans like OneTax aim to reduce or eliminate income tax compliance costs without instituting a national sales tax.

History
The OneTax and plans like it were first created in the 1990s by policy wonks outside the Beltway, seeking to put forward a tax simplification plan that wasn't regressive. At the time, the major tax reform proposals were the FairTax and flat tax, both of which are regressive with regards to income. The first recorded mention of this reform by a political candidate for national office was at a "Town Hall" campaign event held in Smithfield, Rhode Island in 2002. In 2011, the Republican Presidential Primary race brought tax reform proposals to the fore. In addition, discussion of the plan as a way to eliminate the income tax for "the 99%" was a topic of the Occupy Movement.

Implementation
The core piece of the reform is a proposed Constitutional Amendment which repeals the Sixteenth Amendment to the United States Constitution, but carves out taxes on income to remain in place for two specifically defined ways:

1. The United States federal government may tax income on those individuals earning more than ten times the per capita income as determined by the most recent census.

2. The United States federal government may continue to collect a payroll tax on all workers, the proceeds of which are earmarked for exclusive transfer to, or provision of health care benefits for, those persons aged 65 or older.

Effects
The primary effect is the elimination of the present personal income tax system and the elimination of 97.6% of all personal income tax compliance costs, and the elimination of more than 96% of the current deadweight loss. These two items are predicted to create an immediate boost of more than $2.1 trillion to the lagging U.S. economy.

Controversy
It is not in dispute that the OneTax will lead to higher effective tax rates for higher-income individuals (or it will lead to significantly lower federal spending). Many opponents of such tax changes argue that the country's highest income earners are the economy's "job creators". These opponents claim that taxing wealthy individuals at a higher rates will discourage job creation.

Others argue that the current low rate of tax on capital gains encourages investment and is necessary for the long-term stability and growth of the United States and world economy. Meanwhile, still others, such as Warren Buffett claim that higher tax rates on the rich do not discourage investment and growth.

See also
 Excess burden of taxation
 FairTax
 Flat tax
 Land value tax
 Occupy movement
 Optimal tax
 Single tax
 Tax reform
 9-9-9 plan

References

External links

Political movements
Tax reform in the United States